Pochak (also known as Poj and Pojak) is a village in Piveshk Rural District, Lirdaf District, Jask County, Hormozgan Province, Iran. At the 2006 census, its population was 442, in 106 families.

References 

Populated places in Jask County